Izaac Farrell (born 30 January 1998) is a professional rugby league footballer who plays as a scrum-half for the Sheffield Eagles in the Betfred Championship. 

Izaac is a product of the Giants' academy system and is the son of former Huddersfield, Sheffield, and Leeds player Anthony Farrell and the brother of current Sheffield Eagles player Joel Farrell

In 2017 he made his Challenge Cup début for the Huddersfield Giants against the Swinton Lions.

In 2018 he joined the Batley Bulldogs in the Betfred Championship on a season long loan.

He made his Super League debut for the Giants in February 2019.

In 2020, Farrell joined his brother Joel at Sheffield Eagles, where he has played regularly since his arrival at the Steel City club.

Personal life
Born in England, Farrell is of Jamaican descent.

References

External links
Sheffield Eagles profile
Huddersfield Giants profile
SL profile

1998 births
Living people
Batley Bulldogs players
English rugby league players
English people of Jamaican descent
Huddersfield Giants players
Rochdale Hornets players
Rugby league halfbacks
Rugby league players from Huddersfield
Sheffield Eagles players
Swinton Lions players
Workington Town players
Jamaica national rugby league team players